Martin Selway (born 1966) is a Welsh international lawn bowler.

Bowls career
He competed for Wales at the 2006 Commonwealth Games and 2010 Commonwealth Games.

In 2007 he won the pairs gold medal and fours bronze medal at the Atlantic Bowls Championships and in 2009 he won the triples and fours bronze medals at the Atlantic Bowls Championships.

He is a four times Welsh champion winning the 1996 & 2008 pairs, 2007 triples and 2006 fours at the Welsh National Bowls Championships and became a British champion winning the 2009 pairs at the British Isles Bowls Championships.

References

1966 births
Living people
Bowls players at the 2006 Commonwealth Games
Bowls players at the 2010 Commonwealth Games
Welsh male bowls players